Pedro Adigue Jr. (November 16, 1943 – November 20, 2003) was a world champion boxer. He came from the small town of Bontod in Palanas, Masbate, the Philippines.

Early life
Pedro was born on November 16, 1943 in Bontod, Masbate, Philippines.

Professional career

Adigue became a professional boxer on February 18, 1962. After 14 bouts (11 wins, 1 loss and 2 draws), he fought Carl Peñalosa for the Philippine lightweight title but lost on points. Adigue challenged Peñalosa again for the same title on August 2, 1965 but this time won by knockout in the 7th round. He defended his crown once with a decision win over Rudy Perucho June 10, 1966.

He then won the Oriental and Pacific Boxing Federation (OPBF) lightweight title on September 30, 1966 and has defended it five times.

He then won the vacant WBC light welterweight championship in 1968 at the Araneta Coliseum in Quezon City, Philippines, when he defeated Adolph Pruitt. In his first defense on January 31, 1970, he lost the title to Bruno Arcari by a unanimous decision. He won the OPBF light welterweight title in 1973. Adigue retired in 1977.

Death

Pedro died on November 20, 2003 in Rizal Medical Center, Pasig, Metro Manila, Philippines due to metastasized throat cancer.

Professional boxing record

See also
List of world light-welterweight boxing champions
List of Filipino boxing world champions

References

External links

 

|-

1943 births
2003 deaths
Filipino male boxers
People from Masbate
Light-welterweight boxers
World light-welterweight boxing champions
World Boxing Council champions